The 2017 Radio Disney Music Awards was held on April 29, 2017, at the Microsoft Theater in Los Angeles, California. The ceremony was shown on Radio Disney and Disney Channel the following night on April 30, 2017 from 7:00-9:00 p.m. (EDT).

Production
On January 25, 2017, Radio Disney announced the five hosts of the 2017 edition: the singers Jordan Fisher, Kelsea Ballerini and Sofia Carson, the actress Jenna Ortega and Radio Disney's host Alex Aiono were chosen. The artists were chosen through a Twitter poll, where the audience indicated the names that should be invited. Tickets to attend the award show were available on March 3, 2017.

Performances

Winners and Nominees
The nominees were announced on March 3, 2017.
Winners are listed first and highlighted in bold.

References

External links

Radio Disney Music Awards
Radio Disney
Radio Disney
Radio Disney
Radio Disney Music Awards